The 2017 RBC Pro Challenge was a professional tennis tournament played on outdoor hard courts. It was the first edition of the tournament and was part of the 2017 ITF Women's Circuit. It took place in Tyler, United States, on 30 October–5 November 2017.

Singles main draw entrants

Seeds 

 1 Rankings as of 23 October 2017.

Other entrants 
The following players received a wildcard into the singles main draw:
  Hanna Chang
  Sophie Chang
  Allie Kiick
  Jessica Pegula

The following player received entry by a special exempt:
  Victoria Duval

The following players received entry from the qualifying draw:
  Ashley Kratzer
  Yuliya Lysa
  Amanda Rodgers
  Caitlin Whoriskey

Champions

Singles

 Kristie Ahn def.  Danielle Collins, 6–4, 6–4

Doubles
 
 Jessica Pegula /  Taylor Townsend def.  Jamie Loeb /  Rebecca Peterson, 6–4, 6–1

External links 
 2017 RBC Pro Challenge at ITFtennis.com
 Official website

2017 ITF Women's Circuit
2017 in American sports
Tennis tournaments in the United States